Teona Gardapkhadze known as TEYÓ is a Georgian fashion designer based in Tbilisi, Georgia.

Early life and education

Teona was born in 1983. She graduated an Architecture department of Tbilisi State Academy of Arts. In 2006 she decided to try herself in fashion design. Inspiration + Tendency + Love is a formula of Teona's brand TEYÓ, which was created in 2012. Same year she presented her first f/w collection at Tbilisi Fashion Week. After her debut she successfully works for several stores in Azerbaijan, Kazakhstan and Russia, as well as in Georgia.

Career

Her clothes are chosen by many celebrities, including Sheikha Mozah; Ukrainian singer, actress, songwriter, winner of the Eurovision Song Contest 2016 - Jamala; singer and the current vocalist for the group A-Studio - Keti Topuria; Russian journalist Evelina Khromtchenko and others.

References 

1983 births
Fashion designers from Georgia (country)
Tbilisi State Academy of Arts alumni
Living people